Outback Bound is a 1988 American television film about a snooty Beverly Hills woman who goes to outback Australia.

References

External links

Outback Bound at TCMDB
Review at Los Angeles Times
Trailer at YouTube

1980s English-language films
1988 television films
1988 films
1980s romantic comedy-drama films
American romantic comedy-drama films
Australian romantic comedy-drama films
Australian drama television films
Comedy-drama television films
Films about kidnapping
Films directed by John Llewellyn Moxey
Films set in Australia
Films shot in Australia
Romance television films
Films scored by Miles Goodman
1980s American films